Athenkosi Mcaba (born 9 January 2002) is a South African professional soccer player who plays as a defender for Stellenbosch and the South Africa national team.

Club career
Mcaba was born in Springs on 9 January 2002. After playing for Jealous Down FC, an amateur side in Springs, he played for the Bidvest Wits academy between 2017 and 2020. A spell with Cape Umoya United followed in early 2021, before he signed for Stellenbosch in June 2021, initially joining their reserve side before joining their first team in August. He made his senior debut on 4 December 2021, starting in a back three against Mamelodi Sundowns as Stellenbosch drew 1–1.

International career
Mcaba was part of the South African under-17 team for the 2018 COSAFA Under-17 Championship, in which South Africa lost the final 1–0 to Angola. He was named in a senior South Africa squad for the first time in March 2022 for fixtures against Guinea and France. He made his debut for South Africa as a second-half substitute in the 0–0 draw with Guinea.

References

External links

2002 births
Living people
South African soccer players
South Africa international soccer players
South Africa youth international soccer players
People from Springs, Gauteng
Sportspeople from Gauteng
Association football defenders
Bidvest Wits F.C. players
Cape Umoya United F.C. players
Stellenbosch F.C. players
South African Premier Division players